Birketts are the 541 English peaks described in Bill Birkett's 1994 guidebook, Complete Lakeland Fells.

Bill Birkett's book became a popular list for peak bagging in the Lake District, along with the more popular Wainwrights.  Because both lists are based on historical books, unlike for example the Murdos, their constituents remain fixed, regardless of revisions to height or other metrics.  In this regard, they are similar to the Scottish lowlands, Donalds.  The Long Distance Walkers Association maintains a register of people who have completed the Birketts.  One of Birkett's peaks, Pillar Rock, which is also classed as a Nuttall, but not a Wainwright, requires climbing ropes and climbing equipment to summit.

There are 541 Birketts, which include 212 of the 214 Wainwrights, and 59 of the 116 Wainwright Outlying Fells. While 65 of the Birketts have a prominence above , and are Marilyns, 159 have a prominence below , and 42 of these are below . 54 of the 514 peaks are solely Birketts, and meet no other mountain or hill classification in the British Isles.

Birketts by height

This list is from the Database of British and Irish Hills ("DoBIH") in October 2018, and are peaks the DoBIH marks as being Birketts ("B").  The DoBIH updates their measurements as more surveys are recorded, so these tables should not be amended or updated unless the entire DoBIH data is re–downloaded again.

Wainwrights that are not Birketts

This list is from the Database of British and Irish Hills ("DoBIH") in October 2018, and are five Lake District peaks the DoBIH marks as being Wainwrights ("W"), but not Birketts ("B").  The DoBIH updates their measurements as more surveys are recorded, so these tables should not be amended or updated unless the entire DoBIH data is re-downloaded again.

Bibliography

DoBIH codes

The DoBIH uses the following codes for the various classifications of mountains and hills in the British Isles, which many of the above peaks also fall into:

suffixes:=	twin

See also

List of mountains of the British Isles by height
List of mountains of the British Isles by prominence
Lists of mountains and hills in the British Isles
List of Wainwrights in the Lake District
List of hill passes of the Lake District
The Outlying Fells of Lakeland

Notes

References

External links
The Database of British and Irish Hills (DoBIH), the largest database of British Isles mountains
Hill Bagging UK & Ireland, the searchable interface for the DoBIH
The Relative Hills of Britain, a website dedicated to mountain and hill classification

Birketts

Birketts